Australian Boardriders Battle is an annual event held by Surfing Australia. Since 2017 the national competition finals have been hosted at Newcastle, New South Wales in February each year. Fox Sports also airs the Australian Boardriders Battle live. The national finals of the first three series were held at Cronulla Beach in Sydney on the Australia Day weekend in late January.

Series

Results

Results by year (top clubs)

2014
  Snapper Rocks Surfriders (QLD) 3780
  Elouera Boardriders (NSW) 3250
  Merewether Surfboard Club (NSW) 3020
  Queenscliff Boardriders (NSW) 2870
  Yallingup Boardriders (WA) 2860
  North Narrabeen Boardriders (NSW) 2660
  Seaford Boardriders (SA) 2650
  Kirra Surfriders (QLD) 2550
  Werri Boardriders (NSW) 2490
  Avoca Boardriders (NSW) 2470
  Cronulla Sharks Boardriders (NSW) 2450
  Torquay Boardriders (VIC) 2350
  13th Beach Boardriders (VIC) 2150
  D-Bah Boardriders (QLD) 2150
  Margaret River Boardriders (WA) 2150
  South Arm Boardriders (TAS) 2050

2015
 1. Snapper Rocks Boardriders, 5525
 2. Coffs Harbour Boardriders, 4800
 3. Culburra Boardriders, 4262
 4. North Narrabeen, 4250
 5. Avoca Boardriders, 4174
 6. Merewether Surfboard Club, 4062
 7. Point Lookout Boardriders, 4050
 8. Bondi Boardriders, 3862
 9. Byron Bay Boardriders, 3851
 10. Le Ba Boardriders, 3850
 11. Scarborough Boardriders, 3762
 12. Margaret River Boardriders, 3750
 13. Kirra Surfriders, 3674
 14. South Coast Boardriders, 3550
 15. Cronulla Sharks Boardriders, 3362
 16. Philip Island Boardriders, 3162
 17. Peninsula Surfriders, 3063
 18. Burleigh Boardriders, 3062
 19. Coolum Boardriders, 2750
 20. South Arm Boardriders, 2550

Media coverage

See also

 Surfing in Australia

References

External links
 

2014 establishments in Australia
Recurring sporting events established in 2014
Surfing organizations
Sports competitions in Sydney
Surfing competitions in Australia
Professional sports leagues in Australia